Skovyatino is a rural locality (a village) in Nikolo-Ramenskoye Rural Settlement, Cherepovetsky District, Vologda Oblast, Russia. The population was 65 as of 2002.

Geography 
Skovyatino is located 84 km southwest of Cherepovets (the district's administrative centre) by road. Nikolo-Ramenye is the nearest rural locality.

References 

Rural localities in Cherepovetsky District